The South West London College was a higher education college located in the Tooting and  Streatham areas of London, England.

The college was founded in 1966, and closed in 1990; initially it was proposed that it would be merged with the Thames Polytechnic, but eventually it was dissolved under the 1988 Education Reform Act. Most of the college's staff and faculty moved to the South Bank Polytechnic.

Notable alumni
 Abdulkadir Ahmed, former Governor of the Central Bank of Nigeria
 Elizabeth Alpha-Lavalie, Sierra Leonean politician
 Adam Kilgarriff, corpus linguist, lexicographer and co-author of Sketch Engine
 Joseph Oladele Sanusi, former Governor of the Central Bank of Nigeria
 Sarafa Tunji Ishola, Nigerian High Commissioner to the United Kingdom

References

Higher education colleges in London
Educational institutions established in 1966
1966 establishments in England
Educational institutions disestablished in 1990
1990 disestablishments in England